Alyce Griffin Clarke (born July 3, 1939) is an American politician. A Democrat, she is a member of the Mississippi House of Representatives from the 69th district, being first elected in 1984.

Early life 
Clarke was born on July 3, 1939, in Yazoo City, Mississippi. She received a bachelor's degree from Alcorn State University and a master's degree from Tuskegee Institute. She also attended Jackson State University and Mississippi College. Prior running for office, Clarke worked in education, teaching home economics. She also worked as a nutritionist at a community health center in Hinds County. She married L.W. Clarke Jr and they had one child, Demarquis Johntrell.

Political career 
Clarke was first elected to the Mississippi House of Representatives for the 69th district in 1984. She was the first black woman elected to the Mississippi Legislature. She worked on bringing the federal Women, Infants and Children food program to the state, setting up drug courts and organizing school breakfasts. In the 1990s, she founded a short-lived "biracial, bipartisan" Women's Caucus in the Mississippi House.

She is set to retire at the 2023 Mississippi elections in November.

Personal life
In 1981, she was diagnosed with multiple sclerosis.

References

1939 births
Living people
Democratic Party members of the Mississippi House of Representatives
People from Yazoo City, Mississippi
People with multiple sclerosis
African-American state legislators in Mississippi
21st-century American politicians
American educators
21st-century African-American politicians
20th-century African-American people